Nevin Harrison (born June 2, 2002) is an American sprint canoeist. She competed at the 2020 Summer Olympics in Tokyo, winning the gold medal in the women's C-1 200 meters.

Career 
She began canoeing at age 12 with the Seattle Canoe and Kayak Club in Seattle, Washington. She began competing for the USA at age 15, competing at the 2017 ICF Olympic Hopes Regatta in Račice, Czech Republic, winning silver in C-1 1000m, gold in 500m and gold in 200m in the 2002 age group. The next year, at the 2018 ICF Olympic Hopes Regatta in Poznan, Poland, she won gold in C-1 500m and 200m in the 2002 age group. In 2019, she moved to the Lanier Canoe and Kayak Club Racing Team in Gainesville, Georgia to train with coach Zsolt Szadovszki. At the 2019 USA Team Trials in Oklahoma City, she won senior and junior C-1 1000m, 500m and 200m. She competed at the 2019 Pan American Games in Lima, Peru and won C-1 200m. At the 2019 ICF Canoe Sprint World Championships, she won gold in C-1 200m, becoming the first American to win a world championship in sprint canoe.

References

External links
 "I'm strong and I'm good at this": How 19-year-old Nevin Harrison won gold | NBC Sports August 6, 2021

2002 births
Living people
American female canoeists
ICF Canoe Sprint World Championships medalists in Canadian
Sportspeople from Seattle
Pan American Games medalists in canoeing
Pan American Games gold medalists for the United States
Canoeists at the 2019 Pan American Games
Medalists at the 2019 Pan American Games
Canoeists at the 2020 Summer Olympics
Medalists at the 2020 Summer Olympics
Olympic gold medalists for the United States in canoeing
21st-century American women